Leurotrigona is a genus of bees belonging to the family Apidae.

The species of this genus are found in Southern America.

Species:

Leurotrigona crispula 
Leurotrigona gracilis 
Leurotrigona muelleri 
Leurotrigona pusilla

References

Meliponini